Robert Earl "Bob" Kenney (June 23, 1931 – October 27, 2014) was an All-State basketball player at Winfield High School in Winfield, Kansas as well as an American basketball player who competed in the Basketball at the 1952 Summer Olympics. He was part of the American basketball team, which won the gold medal in seven matches. Prior to that, he played for the University of Kansas team.

In 1999, Kenney was inducted into the Kansas Sports Hall of Fame

References

External links
Profile on DatabaseOlympics.com

1931 births
2014 deaths
American men's basketball players
Basketball players at the 1952 Summer Olympics
Basketball players at the 1955 Pan American Games
Basketball players from Kansas
Kansas Jayhawks men's basketball players
Medalists at the 1952 Summer Olympics
Olympic gold medalists for the United States in basketball
Pan American Games gold medalists for the United States
United States men's national basketball team players
Pan American Games medalists in basketball
Medalists at the 1955 Pan American Games